Shafiabad (also Romanized as Shafī‘ābād; also known as Shā‘fīabād Bātān) is a village in Rivand Rural District, in the Central District of Nishapur County, Razavi Khorasan Province, Iran. At the 2006 census, its population was 23, in 8 families.

References 

Populated places in Nishapur County